Kastro may refer to :

Places 
 Kastro, a town in the municipality of Kastro-Kyllini in Greece
 Kastro, Thasos, a small village on the island of Thasos in Greece
 (Vryo)Kastro, presumed (pre)historical capital of Kythnos island (Cyclades, Aegean Greece)
 Kastro, Grevena, a village in West Macedonia, Greece
 Kavousi Kastro), a Late Bronze-Early Iron Age settlement near the modern village of Kavousi in eastern Crete
 Kastros, a Neolithic settlement on the island of Cyprus

People 
 Kastro (rapper) (born 1976), an American rapper and member of Tupac Shakur's rap group, Outlawz
 Kastro Zizo (born 1984), an Albanian musician
 Kastro (Hunter × Hunter), a fictional character in the manga series Hunter × Hunter

See also 
 Castro (disambiguation)
 Kastor (disambiguation)
 Gastro-, common English-language prefix derived from the ancient Greek γαστήρ gastēr ("stomach")